The Melotte catalogue is a catalogue of 245 star clusters compiled by British astronomer Philibert Jacques Melotte. It was published in 1915 as A Catalogue of Star Clusters shown on Franklin-Adams Chart Plates. Catalogue objects are denoted by Melotte, e.g. "Melotte 20". Dated prefixes include as Mel + catalogue number, e.g. "Mel 20".

The catalogue contains 161 open clusters, 81 globular clusters, two asterisms, and one galaxy.

Melotte objects

Errors
There are some errors in Melotte's list:
 Mel 28 and 29 are asterisms.
 The elliptical or lenticular galaxy Mel 57 was mistaken for a globular cluster.

See also
List of astronomical catalogues
Collinder catalogue - a similar catalogue of open star clusters published by Per Collinder in 1931.
Trumpler catalogue - a similar catalogue of open star clusters published by Robert Julius Trumpler in 1930.

References

External links

Astronomical catalogues
Star clusters